Balsam Beartown Mountain is a mountain located in Tazewell County, Virginia, in the United States. The mountain is the sixth-highest mountain in Virginia by elevation, sixth in the state by prominence, as well as sixth in the state by isolation.

References

Mountains of Virginia
Blue Ridge Mountains
Landforms of Russell County, Virginia
George Washington and Jefferson National Forests